John Georgiades (born 3 January 1966) is a former Australian rules footballer who played for Subiaco in the West Australian Football League (WAFL) and Footscray in the Australian Football League (AFL).

Georgiades made his debut for Subiaco in the 1986 WAFL season. An "abundantly skilled half-forward", he had a breakout year in 1988, kicking 65 goals from 22 games. He finished runner-up to Todd Breman in the Bernie Naylor Medal. He capped off his season by kicking six goals in Subiaco's preimership victory over Claremont in the 1988 WAFL Grand Final, and was regarded as unlucky not to win the Simpson Medal as best on ground. He also polled 25 votes in the Sandover Medal, only five behind the eventual winner Mark Watson. 

Georgiades was drafted by Footscray at number 35 at the 1988 VFL Draft. He is remembered for his debut in Round 1 of the 1989 season where he kicked 8 goals against Carlton. Only three players have kicked more goals on debut in VFL/AFL history. Georgiades's career failed to continue and his career ended after 15 games. Later that season he would accidentally kick Trevor Barker's face in an attempt to kick the ball off the ground on a dismal day at VFL Park Waverley. Barker only got two possessions and Georgiades kicked no goals.

Georgiades's son Mitch made his AFL debut for Port Adelaide in round one of the 2020 AFL season.

References

External links

1966 births
Australian rules footballers from Western Australia
Australian people of Greek descent
Western Bulldogs players
Subiaco Football Club players
Living people